René Bot (born 6 November 1978 in Velsen) is a Dutch retired footballer. He normally played as a defender in a right back position, but could also play as a centre back.

Club career
He started his career with Feyenoord but only played six matches in the first team. After a loan period at the club, Bot joined De Graafschap definitively in 1999 and was part of their first team for over ten years. An unyielding defender, Bot became a cult hero at the club due to his tough style and loyalty.

He ended his professional career with Eerste Divisie side AGOVV Apeldoorn. Due to a long period of injuries he only played eleven matches in two years. He later played for amateur side FC Presikhaaf.

Personal life
Bot is married to a Turkish woman and converted to Islam.

As of 2016, Bot works for Doetinchem municipality.

References

External links
Profile at Voetbal International

1978 births
Living people
People from Velsen
Association football fullbacks
Dutch footballers
AGOVV Apeldoorn players
De Graafschap players
Feyenoord players
Eredivisie players
Eerste Divisie players
Dutch Muslims
Converts to Islam
Footballers from North Holland